Ingeborg of Mecklenburg (1343/45 – 25 July 1395) was a daughter of Albert II, Duke of Mecklenburg and his wife, Euphemia of Sweden.  Euphemia was a daughter of Ingeborg of Norway, who was the only legitimate child of King Haakon V of Norway.  Thus, Ingeborg of Mecklenburg was Haakon V's great-granddaughter.

In 1360, she married Louis VI "the Roman" of Bavaria; she was his second wife. The marriage remained childless.

After Louis's death, she married Henry II, Count of Holstein-Rendsburg. They had at least four children:
 Gerhard VI, Count of Holstein; married, in 1391, Catherine Elisabeth of Brunswick-Lüneburg and had issue.
 Albert II, Count of Holstein-Rendsburg
 Henry III, Count of Schauenburg-Holstein (d. 1421), Prince-Bishop of Osnabrück as Henry I
 Sofia of Holstein (1375, Lübeck – 1448); married, in 1398, Bogislaw VIII, Duke of Pomerania (1364–1418) and had issue.

References

Ingeborg
1343 births
1395 deaths
14th-century German nobility
Ingeborg
Ingeborg
Electresses of Brandenburg
German countesses
14th-century German women
Daughters of monarchs
Remarried royal consorts